The Departmental Council of Aude is the deliberative assembly of the French department of Aude in Occitanie. Its headquarters are in Carcassonne.

Presidents 
The president of the Aude departmental council is Hélène Sandragné (PS) since July 2, 2020.

Vice-presidents

References 

Aude
Aude